Erik Christian Haugaard  (April 13, 1923 – June 4, 2009) was a Danish-born American writer, best known for children's books and for his translations of the works of Hans Christian Andersen.

Biography
Erik Christian Haugaard was born in Frederiksberg, Denmark. He was the son of Professor Gottfred and Karen (Pedersen) Haugaard. He came to the United States in 1940 after fleeing the Nazi invasion of Denmark, and served in the Royal Canadian Air Force before the end of World War II. He attended Black Mountain College in North Carolina from 1941 to 1942. He also attended the New School for Social Research in New York City.

In 1963, he published his first book for children and young adults, Hakon of Rogen's Saga. The book was well received by readers and critics and was named an American Library Association Notable Book. His literary awards include recognition for his 1978 translation of The Complete Fairy Tales and Stories of Hans Christian Andersen. Haugaard married Myrna Seld in 1949 and together they had two children. They later lived in Denmark and Ireland.  He died at Ballydehob in County Cork, Ireland.

Work papers of Erik Christian Haugaard are maintained in the de Grummond Children's Literature Collection at the University of Southern Mississippi. The collection consists of material received from Erik Haugaard and Houghton Mifflin between 1967 and 1984.

The University of Minnesota collection of Erik Christian Haugaard papers contains production material, consisting of manuscript materials, for nine titles published between 1963 and 1995.

Awards
The first inaugural Boston Globe–Horn Book Award  recognizing The Little Fishes as the year's best children's fiction (1967)
Phoenix Award from the Children's Literature Association  recognized The Rider and his Horse as the best children's book published twenty years earlier that did not win a major award (1988)
 New York Herald Tribune Children's Spring Book Festival (1962, 1967)
 Jane Addams Award (1968)
 Culture Minister of Denmark Prize (1970)
John Golden Fund for the play, The Heroes (1958) 
American Library Association Notable Book Award for A Slave's Tale (1965)

Selected works
Hakon of Rogen's Saga (1963)
A Slave's Tale (1965) Historical novel about Vikings and Christianity 
The Little Fishes (1967) 
The Rider and His Horse (1968)
Chase Me, Catch Nobody! (1980)
Leif the Unlucky (1982)
Boy's Will (1983)
The Samurai's Tale (1984)
Cromwells Boy (1990)
Boy and the Samurai (1991)
The Death of Mr. Angel (1992)
The Revenge of the Forty-Seven Samurai (1995)

See also

References

Citations
Berger, Laura Standley Twentieth-Century Children's Writers (St James Guide to Children's Writers. 3rd edition Jan 1995)

External links
 Profile: An interview with Erik Christian Haugaard (preview) at JSTOR: Language Arts 56:5 (May 1979)
 Erik Cristian Haugaard at Library of Congress Authorities — with 28 catalog records

 

1923 births
2009 deaths
American children's writers
Danish children's writers
Danish emigrants to the United States
People from Frederiksberg
The New School alumni
Black Mountain College alumni
Date of death missing
Place of death missing
Danish–English translators
20th-century translators
American historical novelists
Writers of historical fiction set in the Middle Ages
Writers of historical fiction set in the early modern period